Plataea is a genus of geometrid moths in the family Geometridae. There are about 11 described species in Plataea.

Species
These 11 species belong to the genus Plataea:
 Plataea aristidesi Rindge, 1976 c g
 Plataea blanchardaria Knudson, 1986 i g b
 Plataea calcaria (Pearsall, 1911) i c g b
 Plataea californiaria Herrich-Schäffer, 1856 i c g b
 Plataea diva Hulst, 1896 i c g b
 Plataea mexicana Druce, 1899 c g
 Plataea pausaniasi Rindge, 1976 c g
 Plataea personaria (H. Edwards, 1881) i c g b
 Plataea polychroma Ferris & McFarland, 2010 i g b
 Plataea trilinearia (Packard, 1873) i c g b (sagebrush girdle)
 Plataea ursaria Cassino & Swett, 1922 i c g b
Data sources: i = ITIS, c = Catalogue of Life, g = GBIF, b = Bugguide.net

References

Further reading

External links

 

Ourapterygini